"Tous ces mots" is a song recorded by the France-born singer Nâdiya accompanied by the English rapper Smartzee. The song was released as the first single from Nâdiya's self-titled third studio album Nâdiya on February 24, 2006 (see 2006 in music) in France and Switzerland.

Music video
The song features Smartzee, a rapper who was also featured in her "Et c'est parti..." song and music video. In the music video for "Tous ces mots", auto races are particularly shown, with Nâdiya in one of the cars racing. She is also shown 'performing' the song on a podium. In the end, Nâdiya's pink car wins.

Chart performance
The Syndicat National de l'Edition Phonographique (SNEP) has revealed the best-selling singles during the first quarter of 2006 (from January 1 - March 31, 2006) and despite being released four weeks before the first quarter of 2006 ended, the single managed the song to peak at number thirteen.

Later, in December 2006, SNEP released a document with the best-selling singles from the first till the third quarter of 2006 (from January 1 till September 30). In this document, "Tous ces mots" ranked number thirteen again, this time with the following single "Roc" being at number twelve.

On the same website, a top 50 has been composed with the best-downloaded songs in 2006, with "Tous ces mots" peaking at number thirty-eight.

Track listings
Digital download
"Tous ces mots" (radio edit) – 3:35

CD single (10:40)
"Tous ces mots" (radio edit) – 3:35
"Flash back" featuring Zo – 3:30
"Tous ces mots" (original karaoke version) – 3:35

Charts

Certifications

References

2006 singles
Nâdiya songs
Songs written by Géraldine Delacoux
Songs written by Thierry Gronfier
2006 songs
Sony BMG singles